Events in the year 1781 in Norway.

Incumbents
Monarch: Christian VII

Events
11 April - Oplandenes amt was split into two, with the western part becoming Kristians amt and the eastern part becoming Hedemarkens amt.

Arts and literature
Edvard Storm writes Zinklars vise ("Ballad of Sinclair").

Births

19 May – Lars Andreas Oftedahl, priest and politician (died 1843)
1 December – Ferdinand Carl Maria Wedel-Jarlsberg, commanding general of the Norwegian Army (died 1857)
10 December – Christian Hersleb Horneman, jurist and politician (died 1860).

Full date unknown
Palle Rømer Fleischer, politician and Minister (died 1851)
Edvard Hagerup, solicitor and politician (died 1853)
Jørgen Young, merchant and politician (died 1837)

Deaths

See also

References